Hrynky may refer to the following places in Ukraine:

Hrynky, Poltava Oblast, village in Kremenchuk Raion
Hrynky, Ternopil Oblast, village in Kremenets Raion
Hrynky, Zhytomyr Oblast, village in Zviahel Raion